Chiedozie Ogbene (born 1 May 1997) is an Irish professional footballer who plays as a winger for Rotherham United and the Republic of Ireland national team. 

Ogbene began his career in Ireland with Cork City and Limerick, before transferring to Brentford in 2018. After a loan spell with Exeter City he moved to Rotherham United in 2019.

Early and personal life
Born in Lagos, Nigeria, Ogbene moved with his family (including two brothers and two sisters) to Ireland in 2005, after his father got a job in the country, rejecting an offer of a job in Florida in the process. He grew up in the Grange area of Cork. He attended Bunscoil Chríost Rí. He is a supporter of Liverpool.

Club career
Ogbene played Gaelic football for Nemo Rangers and association football for Munster Senior League clubs Tramore Athletic, College Corinthians, Kilreen Celtic and Everton. He scored 1–2 and was awarded man of the match in an under-21 final for Nemo Rangers in 2015, his last appearance for the club.

He signed for Cork City in August 2015. He won the Enda McGuill Cup with their under-19 youth team, and the 2016 FAI Cup with their senior team.

He signed for fellow League of Ireland club Limerick in January 2017. He was nominated three times for the League of Ireland Player of the Month award.

In November 2017 he was linked with a transfer to English club Aston Villa.

On 30 January 2018, Ogbene signed for English club Brentford on a three-and-a-half year contract for an undisclosed fee. He made his league debut on 10 April 2018, making one further appearance that season. He moved on loan to Exeter City in August 2018.

On 29 August 2019, Ogbene joined League One club Rotherham United for an undisclosed fee, signing a three-year contract. In 2019–20, he played a central role in Rotherham's promotion-winning season, being described by manager Paul Warne as "unplayable" after he helped Rotherham beat Bristol Rovers by 3–0. He was injured between October 2020 and April 2021.

On 3 April 2022 he scored a goal as Rotherham won the EFL Trophy in a 4–2 victory over Sutton United.

International career
He was eligible to represent both Republic of Ireland and Nigeria at international level. In July 2020, Ogbene approached Republic of Ireland manager Stephen Kenny to declare his wish to play for the national team. On 24 May 2021, Ogbene received his first call up to the Republic of Ireland senior squad for the summer friendlies against Andorra and Hungary. He said he hoped to be a role model for other Irish players from a similar background. He made his debut on 8 June 2021 against Hungary, becoming the first African-born player to represent the Republic of Ireland. The Irish players had been booed by Hungarian fans prior to kick-off for taking the knee in a symbolic gesture against racism in the sport, which Ogbene asked UEFA to investigate.

Ogbene scored his first international goal on 9 October 2021 in a 2022 FIFA World Cup qualifier against Azerbaijan with a 90th minute header in a 3–0 win at Baku Olympic Stadium.

Career statistics

Club

International

Scores and results list the Republic of Ireland's goal tally first, score column indicates score after each Ogbene goal.

Honours
Cork City
FAI Cup: 2016

Rotherham United
League One runner-up: 2021–22
EFL Trophy: 2021–22

References

1997 births
Living people
Association football wingers
Black Irish sportspeople
Expatriate footballers in England
Gaelic footballers who switched code
Irish expatriate sportspeople in England
Irish people of Nigerian descent
Irish sportspeople of African descent
Nemo Rangers Gaelic footballers
Nigerian emigrants to Ireland
Nigerian footballers
Republic of Ireland association footballers
Republic of Ireland expatriate association footballers
Republic of Ireland international footballers
League of Ireland players
English Football League players
Tramore Athletic F.C. players
College Corinthians A.F.C. players
Cork City F.C. players
Limerick F.C. players
Brentford F.C. players
Exeter City F.C. players
Rotherham United F.C. players